Hilltown Township is a township in Bucks County, Pennsylvania, United States. The population was 15,029 at the 2010 census. Most of Hilltown is part of Pennridge School District, while a small portion in Line Lexington is part of North Penn School District.

History
The Uneek Havana Cigar Company at Blooming Glen and Green Hills Farm are listed on the National Register of Historic Places.  Green Hills Farm is also designated a National Historic Landmark.

Geography
It is located in the Delaware watershed and is drained by the East Branch Perkiomen Creek and Neshaminy Creek.

Its villages include Bean, Bethon, Blooming Glen, Deep Run, Fair Hill, Fricks, Griers Corner (also in Bedminster and Plumstead Townships,) Hilltown, Keystone Point, Kulps Corner (also in Bedminster Township), Leidytown, Line Lexington (also in New Britain Township and Montgomery County,) Loux Corner (Albrights Corner), Mount Pleasant, Naces Corner, New Galena, Pennville, Snoveltown, Thomas Corner, and Unionville (also in Montgomery County).

Natural features in the township include Deep Run, Hardiaken Creek, Mill Creek, Perkiomen Creek (East Branch), and Pleasant Spring Creek.

Neighboring municipalities
 New Britain Township (southeast)
 Plumstead Township (east)
 Bedminster Township (northeast)
 Dublin (northeast)
 East Rockhill Township (north)
 Perkasie (northwest)
 Sellersville (northwest)
 West Rockhill Township (west)
 Telford (west)
 Souderton, Montgomery County (southwest)
 Franconia Township, Montgomery County (southwest)
 Hatfield Township, Montgomery County (south)

Hilltown Township surrounds the borough of Silverdale.

Demographics

As of the 2010 census, the township was 92.7% White, 2.0% Black or African American, 0.1% Native American, 3.1% Asian, 0.1% Native Hawaiian, and 1.3% were two or more races. 2.8% of the population were of Hispanic or Latino ancestry.

As of the census of 2000, there were 12,102 people, 4,275 households, and 3,390 families residing in the township.  The population density was 449.7 people per square mile (173.6/km).  There were 4,370 housing units at an average density of 162.4/sq mi (62.7/km).  The racial makeup of the township was 95.94% White, 1.54% African American, 0.09% Native American, 1.08% Asian, 0.02% Pacific Islander, 0.33% from other races, and 0.99% from two or more races. Hispanic or Latino of any race were 1.46% of the population.

There were 4,275 households, out of which 37.5% had children under the age of 18 living with them, 69.1% were married couples living together, 7.0% had a female householder with no husband present, and 20.7% were non-families. 16.4% of all households were made up of individuals, and 6.8% had someone living alone who was 65 years of age or older.  The average household size was 2.81 and the average family size was 3.17.

In the township the population was spread out, with 27.2% under the age of 18, 6.1% from 18 to 24, 30.6% from 25 to 44, 24.1% from 45 to 64, and 12.1% who were 65 years of age or older.  The median age was 37 years. For every 100 females, there were 97.5 males.  For every 100 females age 18 and over, there were 94.4 males.

The median income for a household in the township was $63,178, and the median income for a family was $69,183. Males had a median income of $46,145 versus $30,566 for females. The per capita income for the township was $25,800.  About 3.3% of families and 4.1% of the population were below the poverty line, including 4.8% of those under age 18 and 3.6% of those age 65 or over.

Transportation

Pennsylvania Route 309 is the most prominent highway serving Hilltown Township. It follows the Sellersville Bypass on a southeast-to-northwest alignment through the southwestern portion of the township. Pennsylvania Route 113 follows Souderton Road along a southwest-to-northeast alignment through northern and western sections of the township. Pennsylvania Route 152 follows a southeast-to-northwest alignment utilizing several roads across the central portion of the township. Finally, Pennsylvania Route 313 follows a southeast-to-northwest alignment mostly along Dublin Pike along the northeastern edge of the township.

The southwestern portion of Hilltown Township is served by SEPTA bus Route 132, which runs between the Montgomery Mall and Telford.

Climate

According to the Köppen climate classification system, Hilltown Twp has a Hot-summer, Humid continental climate (Dfa). Dfa climates are characterized by at least one month having an average mean temperature ≤ , at least four months with an average mean temperature ≥ , at least one month with an average mean temperature ≥  and no significant precipitation difference between seasons. Although most summer days are slightly humid in Hilltown Twp, episodes of heat and high humidity can occur with heat index values > . The average wettest month is July which corresponds with the annual peak in thunderstorm activity. Episodes of extreme cold and wind can occur with wind chill values < . Ice storms and large snowstorms depositing ≥  of snow occur once every few years, particularly during nor’easters from December through February.

Ecology

According to the A. W. Kuchler U.S. potential natural vegetation types, Hilltown Twp would have a dominant vegetation type of Appalachian Oak (104) with a dominant vegetation form of Eastern Hardwood Forest (25). The spring bloom typically begins by April 15 and fall color usually peaks by October 26.

References

External links

 Hilltown Township

Townships in Bucks County, Pennsylvania
Townships in Pennsylvania